Matthew Lauria (born August 16, 1982) is an American actor and musician. He made his television debut on the NBC sitcom 30 Rock in 2007. He is best known for his roles as Luke Cafferty on the NBC/DirecTV drama Friday Night Lights, Ryan York on the NBC family drama Parenthood, and Ryan Wheeler on the Audience drama Kingdom. In 2021, Lauria appeared as a series regular on the crime television series CSI: Vegas.

Early life and education
Lauria was born in Virginia and moved to Ireland with his family when he was seven. His father was an animator and an artist. He has two sisters. He spent his formative years growing up in Dublin and moved back to the U.S. to attend high school. He received his formal acting training from the University of North Carolina School of the Arts in their drama conservatory, where he earned a BFA in drama.

Career
Within a few weeks of moving to New York City, Lauria successfully made his television debut as Winthrop on the NBC sitcom 30 Rock. Soon after, he landed a recurring role on the NBC romantic sitcom Lipstick Jungle as Roy Merritt, where he co-starred with Brooke Shields, Andrew McCarthy and Robert Buckley.

Lauria landed his first starring role as Luke Cafferty, #44 of the East Dillon Lions, in the Emmy award-winning NBC/DirecTV drama Friday Night Lights, for which he moved to Pflugerville, Texas in order to film. Lauria remained on the show until it ended in 2011. After finishing Friday Night Lights, Lauria moved to Chicago, Illinois after being cast as Caleb Evers in the Fox crime drama The Chicago Code. The show was cancelled after one season.

He co-starred as Charlie Carnegie on the ABC drama pilot Gilded Lilys created and produced by Shonda Rhimes. From 2012 to 2015, Lauria had a recurring role as Ryan York, a veteran of the Afghanistan war, on the fourth, fifth and sixth seasons of the NBC family drama Parenthood, reuniting with former Friday Night Lights showrunner Jason Katims. He also starred as Ryan Wheeler on the DirecTV drama series Kingdom which premiered on the Audience Network in the fall of 2014. In 2019, he appeared in two action thrillers, opposite Gina Rodriguez and Ismael Cruz Córdova in Miss Bala, directed by Catherine Hardwicke, and Shaft, directed by Tim Story.

In 2019 and 2020, he played the role of Jackson Pruitt on the TV series Tell Me A Story. In 2020, he also played the role of Bill on the TV series Little Birds.

Starting in 2021, he played the role of Josh Folsom on the hit show CSI: Vegas.

Personal life 
Lauria is an avid electric guitarist. On August 26, 2006, he married musician Michelle Armstrong.

Filmography

Film

Television

Notes

References

External links

 

Living people
Male actors from New York City
Male models from Virginia
American male television actors
Male actors from Alexandria, Virginia
University of North Carolina School of the Arts alumni
21st-century American male actors
American male film actors
Male actors from Dublin (city)
1982 births